Kinnersley is a village and civil parish in Herefordshire, England.

Geography 
It has steep hills nearby which almost enclose and shelter Kinnersley. Summers are warm and relatively dry, winters are cool and wet. Surrounding Kinnersley are mostly crops and apple orchards which are owned by local cider companies including H. P. Bulmer. The scenery looks towards the Black Mountains and Hereford. The main Brecon to Leominster road, the A44 passes through Kinnersley.

Community 
Parish population, of about 100,  is employed partly in farming and agriculture, or in nearby towns and cities. The village has a high proportion of pensioners.

The Grade I parish church of Church of St James was restored and improved over many years by George Frederick Bodley, winner of the Royal Gold Medal for architecture in 1899, who had married Minna Reaveley in 1872. Minna was a daughter of the family who at that time owned Kinnersley Castle. Bodley is buried in a Grade II monument in the churchyard. Adjacent to the east from the church is the Grade II* Kinnersley Castle.

The local public house, the Kinnersley Arms closed down in 2022.

References

External links

Kinnersley St James church at britainexpress.com
Ramblings 2014 Tuesday 5 August – Kinnersley Castle at jfarrar.co.uk
Kinnersley Arms website

Villages in Herefordshire